The 2011 Copa Libertadores de América Finals were the final two-legged tie that decided the winner of the 2011 Copa Libertadores de América, the 52nd edition of the Copa Libertadores de América, South America's premier international club football tournament organized by CONMEBOL. The matches were played on 15 and 22 June 2011, between Brazilian club Santos and Uruguayan club Peñarol. Santos made their fourth finals appearance and first since 2003. Peñarol made their tenth finals appearance, and first since 1987. The two teams had previously met in the finals in 1962. Santos won the cup after beating Penarol 2–1 in the second leg of the final.

Qualified teams

Background
The final was contested by Brazilian side Santos and Peñarol of Uruguay, a historic repeat of the 1962 finals disputed by legendary players such as Pelé, Alberto Spencer, Gilmar, Juan Joya, Mauro, José Sasía, Mengálvio, Pedro Rocha, Coutinho, Juan Lezcano, and Pepe, with Lula coaching the Santistas and Béla Guttmann directing the Carboneros. This final is also the first between Brazilian and Uruguayan clubs since the 1983 finals in which Peñarol was dethroned by Grêmio. The venues for the finals is the Estadio Centenario in Montevideo and the Estádio Municipal Paulo Machado de Carvalho (Pacaembu) of São Paulo. Rodrigo Possebon, an Italian player of Santos, became the first European player to participate in a Copa Libertadores finals.

Both teams entered the competition having won it previously, Santos in 1962 and 1963; Peñarol in 1960, 1961, 1966, 1982 and 1987. To reach the final, in the knockout phase Santos beat América, Once Caldas and lastly Cerro Porteño, while Peñarol dethroned defending champion Internacional, beat Universidad Católica and overcame Vélez Sársfield. Santos entered the competition as champions of their domestic cup (the 2010 Copa do Brasil) while Peñarol participated as domestic league winner (winning the 2009–10 Primera División).   

The winners would earn the right to represent CONMEBOL at the 2011 FIFA Club World Cup, entering at the semifinal stage. They would also play against the winners of the 2011 Copa Sudamericana in the 2012 Recopa Sudamericana.

Road to the finals

Rules
The final is played over two legs; home and away. The higher seeded team plays the second leg at home. The team that accumulates the most points —three for a win, one for a draw, zero for a loss— after the two legs is crowned the champion. Should the two teams be tied on points after the second leg, the team with the best goal difference wins. If the two teams have equal goal difference, the away goals rule is not applied, unlike the rest of the tournament. Extra time is played, which consists of two 15-minute halves. If the tie is still not broken, a penalty shootout ensues according to the Laws of the Game.

Matches

First leg

Second leg

See also
2011 FIFA Club World Cup
2012 Recopa Sudamericana

References

External links
Official webpage  

2011
Final
Peñarol matches
Santos FC matches